Rajesh Khaitan  (February 16, 1945 – 15 December 2019) was an Indian politician from West Bengal belonging to Indian National Congress. He was a legislator of the West Bengal Legislative Assembly.

Biography
Khaitan was elected as a legislator of the West Bengal Legislative Assembly from Bara Bazar in 1982. He was also elected from Bara Bazar in 1987, 1991 and 1996.

Khaitan died on 15 December 2019 at the age of 75.

References

1940s births
2019 deaths
Indian National Congress politicians from West Bengal
West Bengal MLAs 1982–1987
West Bengal MLAs 1987–1991
West Bengal MLAs 1991–1996
West Bengal MLAs 1996–2001
People from Kolkata